This is a list of iron mines.

North America

Canada
Adams Mine
Howells Lake-Howells River North mine
KéMag mine
LabMag mine
Lac Otelnuk mine
Lac Ritchie mine
Mary River Mine
Mont Wright (Quebec)
Sheps-Perault Lake mine
Sherman Mine

United States

Benson Mines
Cliffs Shaft Mine Museum
Dorney Road Landfill
Franklin Furnace
Hibernia mines
Hill-Annex Mine State Park
Hull–Rust–Mahoning Open Pit Iron Mine
The Iron Mine, Port Henry, New York
Iron Mountain (Utah)
Iron Mountain District
Iron Mountain Mine
Jackson Mine
Lake Vermilion-Soudan Underground Mine State Park
Lyon Mountain, New York
Montreal Company Location Historic District
Mountain Iron Mine
Paulson Mine
Pioneer Mine
Portsmouth Mine Pit Lake
Pyne Mine
Rouchleau Mine
Sloss Mines
Sterling Lake
Wenonah, Alabama

South America

Bolivia
El Mutún mine

Brazil
Alegria mine
Carajás Mine
Corumbá (mine)
Gongo Soco
Minas-Rio
S11D

Chile
Dominga
El Algarrobo
El Laco
El Romeral mine
El Tofo

Peru
Marcona mine
Pampa de Pongo

Oceania

Australia

Cairn Hill mine
Iron Baron, South Australia
Iron Knob

Africa

Algeria
Gâra Djebilet mine
Ouenza mine

Angola
Cassinga mine

Cameroon
Mbalam mine
Nkout mine

eSwatini
Pigg's Peak mine

Guinea
Kalia mine
Mount Nimba mine
Simandou mine

Liberia
Bong mine
Putu mine

Libya
Shati Valley mine

Madagascar
Bekisopa mine
Betioky mine
Fenoarivo mine
Fenoarivo mine

Mauritania
Askaf
Kaouat mine
Lebtheinia mine

Namibia
Ongaba mine

Nigeria
Agbaja mine
Itakpe mine

The Republic of the Congo
Zanaga mine

Senegal
Falémé mine

Sierra Leone
Marampa mine
Tonkolili mine

South Africa
Beeshoek mine
Khumani mine
Sishen mine

Tanzania
Liganga mine

Zimbabwe
Mwanesi mine

Europe

Austria
Erzberg mine

Belarus
Okulovsky mine

Bosnia and Herzegovina
Ljubija mine

Finland
Kolari mine
Vuorokas mine

Germany
Hansa Pit
Huth Pit
Konrad mine
Roter Bär Pit

Greenland
Isua Iron Mine
Maamorilik

Norway
Bjørnevatn mine

Portugal
Mua mine

Romania
Cacova Ierii mine
Dognecea mine
Gârliște mine
Ghelari mine
Lueta mine
Muncelu Mic mine
Ocna de Fier mine
Rudăria-Bănia mine
Băișoara mine
Teliuc mine

Sweden
Dannemora mine
Herräng
Kallak mine
Kaunisvaara mine
Kiruna mine
Malmberget mine
Mertainen
Rällingsberg mining area
Ruoutevare mine

Ukraine
Belanovskoye mine
Brovarkovskoye mine
Gorishne mine
Ingulets mine
Kharchenkovskoye mine
Manuilovskoye mine
Shymanivske mine
Vasilievskoye mine
Yeristovskoye mine
Zarudenskoye mine

United Kingdom
Clearwell Caves
Great Rock Mine
Grinkle Mine
Grosmont, North Yorkshire
Hodbarrow RSPB reserve
Kelly Mine, Devon
Kilton Thorpe
Lingdale
North Skelton Mine
Penrhyn Dû Mines
Roseberry Mine
Rosedale Chimney Bank
Sharkham Point Iron Mine
Warren Moor Mine

Asia

Armenia
Abovyan mine
Hrazdan mine
Svarants mine

China
Baizhiyan mine
Baoguosi mine
Benxi mine
Gongchangling mine
Jinling mine
Ma On Shan Iron Mine
Pangjiapu mine
Sanheming mine
Shuichang mine
Sijiaying mine
Tadong mine
Wuenduermiao mine
Yuanjiachun mine
Zhalanzhangzhi mine

Iran
Gol Gohar mine

Japan
Matsuo mine

Mongolia
Tamir gol mine

North Korea
Holdong mine
Musan mine
Oryong mine

Russia
Abakanskoye mine
Aldan mine
Bakal mine
Bakcharskoye mine
Belokitatskoye mine
Berezov mine
Berezovskoye mine
Chara mine
Dyosovskoye mine
Enashiminskoye mine
Gar mine
Gornaya Shoriya mine
Gusevogoroskoye mine
Gusevogorskoye mine
Inskoye mine
Itmatinskoye mine
Karasugskoye mine
Karelsky Okatysh mine
Kavakta mine
Kharlovskoye mine
Kholzunskoye mine
Korpanga mine
Kostomuksha mine
Kuznetsky Alatau mine
Lebedinskiy mine
Mikhaylovskiy mine
Milkanskoye mine
Nizhne-Angarskoye mine
Olekma mine
Olimpiyskoye mine
Prioskolsky mine
Sheregesh mine
Sobstvenno-Kachkanarskoye mine
Sukha Balka mine
Tarynnakh mine
Teiskoye mine
Timir mine
Toyozhnoye mine
Turukhanskoye mine
Tyya mine
Yakovlevsky mine
Yuzhno Khingan mine

Saudi Arabia
Wadi Sawawin mine

Turkey
Attepe mine
Avnik mine
Divriği A-Kafa mine
Divriği B-Kafa mine
Hasançelebi mine
Kesikköprü mine

Vietnam
Quý Xa iron mine
Thạch Khê iron mine

See also
 List of countries by iron ore production
 Iron-ore exports by country

Iron mines